Charles Henry Dow (November 6, 1851 – December 4, 1902) was an American journalist who co-founded Dow Jones & Company with Edward Jones and Charles Bergstresser.

Dow also co-founded The Wall Street Journal, which has become one of the most respected financial publications in the world. He also invented the Dow Jones Industrial Average as part of his research into market movements. He developed a series of principles for understanding and analyzing market behavior which later became known as Dow theory, the groundwork for technical analysis.

Early life
Charles Henry Dow was born in Sterling, Connecticut, on November 6, 1851. When he was six years old his father, who was a farmer, died. The family lived in the hills of eastern Connecticut, not far from Rhode Island. Dow did not have much education or training, but he managed to find work at the age of 21 with the Springfield Daily Republican, in Massachusetts. He worked there from 1872 until 1875 as a city reporter for Samuel Bowles, who taught his reporters to write crisp, detailed articles. Dow then moved on to Rhode Island, joining the Providence Star, where he worked for two years as a night editor. He also reported for the Providence Evening Press. In 1877, Dow joined the staff of the prominent Providence Journal. George W. Danielson, the editor there, had not wanted to hire the 26-year-old, but Dow would not take no for an answer. Upon learning that Dow had worked for Bowles for three years, Danielson reconsidered and gave Dow a job writing business stories.

Dow specialized in articles on regional history, some of which were later published in pamphlet form. Dow made history come alive in his writing by explaining the development of various industries and their future prospects. In 1877, he published a History of Steam Navigation between New York and Providence. Three years later, he published Newport: The City by the Sea. It was an account of Newport, Rhode Island's settlement, rise, decline, and rebirth as a summer vacation spot and the location of a naval academy, training station, and war college. Dow reported on Newport real estate investments, recording the money earned and lost during the city's history. He also wrote histories of public education and the prison system in the state. Danielson was so impressed with Dow's careful research that he assigned him to accompany a group of bankers and reporters to Leadville, Colorado, to report on silver mining. The bankers wanted the publicity in order to gain investors in the mines.

In 1879, Dow and various tycoons, geologists, lawmakers, and investors set out on a four-day train trip to reach Colorado. Dow learned a great deal about the world of money on that journey as the men smoked cigars, played cards, and swapped stories. He interviewed many highly successful financiers and heard what sort of information the investors on Wall Street needed to make money. The businessmen seemed to like and trust Dow, knowing that he would quote them accurately and keep a confidence. Dow wrote nine "Leadville Letters" based on his experiences there. He described the Rocky Mountains, the mining companies, and the boomtown's gambling, saloons, and dance halls. He also wrote of raw capitalism and the information that drove investments, turning people into millionaires in a moment. He described the disappearance of the individual mine-owners and the financiers who underwrote shares in large mining consortiums. In his last letter, Dow warned, "Mining securities are not the thing for widows and orphans or country clergymen, or unworldly people of any kind to own. But for a businessman, who must take risks in order to make money; who will buy nothing without careful, thorough investigation; and who will not risk more than he is able to lose, there is no other investment in the market today as tempting as mining stock."

Working on Wall Street
In 1880, Dow left Providence for New York City, realizing that the ideal location for business and financial reporting was there. The 29-year-old found work at the Kiernan Wall Street Financial News Bureau, which delivered by messenger hand written financial news to banks and brokerages. When John J. Kiernan asked Dow to find another reporter for the Bureau, Dow invited Edward Davis Jones to work with him. Jones and Dow had met when they worked together at the Providence Evening Press. Jones, a Brown University dropout, could skillfully and quickly analyze a financial report. He, like Dow, was committed to reporting on Wall Street without bias. Other reporters could be bribed into reporting favorably on a company to drive up stock prices. Dow and Jones refused to manipulate the stock market.

The two young men believed that Wall Street needed another financial news bureau. In November 1882, they started their own agency, Dow, Jones & Company. The business' headquarters was located in the basement of a candy store. Charles Bergstresser was the chief financier of the fledgling company, but chose to be a silent partner. Bergstresser's strength lay in his interviewing skills. Jones once remarked that he could make a wooden Indian talk and tell the truth.

In November 1883, the company started putting out an afternoon two-page summary of the day's financial news called the Customers' Afternoon Letter. It soon achieved a circulation of over 1,000 subscribers and was considered an important news source for investors. It included the Dow Jones stock average, an index that included nine railroad issues, one steamship line, and Western Union.

Simultaneously to his work in publishing, in 1885 Dow also served as a Partner in the NYSE brokerage house of Goodbody, Glynn and Dow where he remained until its dissolution six years later. His Partner, Robert Goodbody, was an Irish citizen and thus at that time ineligible to own a seat. By 1891, both men would part ways. Robert would start his own firm entitled Robert Goodbody & Co, which would become the fifth largest brokerage firm in the United States, before being bought by Merrill Lynch in 1971.

Birth of the Wall Street Journal
In 1889, the company had 50 employees. The partners realized that the time was right to transform their two-page news summary into a real newspaper. The first issue of The Wall Street Journal appeared on July 8, 1889. It cost two cents per issue or five dollars for a one-year subscription. Dow was the editor and Jones managed the deskwork. The paper gave its readers a policy statement: "Its object is to give fully and fairly the daily news attending the fluctuations in prices of stocks, bonds, and some classes of commodities. It will aim steadily at being a paper of news and not a paper of opinions." The paper's motto was "The truth in its proper use." Its editors promised to put out a paper that could not be controlled by advertisers. The paper had a private wire to Boston and telegraph connections to Washington, Philadelphia, and Chicago. It also had correspondents in several cities, including London.

Dow often warned his reporters about exchanging slanted stories for stock tips or free stock. Crusading for honesty in financial reporting, Dow would publish the names of companies that hesitated to give information about profit and loss. Soon after that, the newspaper gained power and respect from the reading public. Vermont Royster, a later editor of the Wall Street Journal, said Dow always believed business information was not the "private province of brokers and tycoons".

In 1898, the Wall Street Journal put out its first morning edition. The paper now covered more than just financial news. It also covered war, which it reported without rhetoric, unlike many other papers. Dow also added an editorial column called "Review and Outlook" and "Answers to Inquirers," in which readers sent investment questions to be answered. Edward Jones retired in 1899, but Dow and Bergstresser continued working. Dow still wrote editorials, now focusing on the place that government held in American business. The Wall Street Journal set a precedent in reporting during the election of 1900 by endorsing a political candidate, the incumbent president William McKinley.

Dow Jones Averages

The stock price average was created on July 3, 1884, by Charles Dow as part of the "Customer's Afternoon Letter". At its inception, it consisted of 11 companies—9 railroads and 2 non-rail companies, Pacific Mail Steamship and Western Union Telegraph.
On September 23, 1889, the “20 Active Stock” index was introduced. It included 18 railroad and 2 non-rail stocks.

In the 1890s, Dow saw that the recession was ending. In 1893, many mergers began taking place, resulting in the formation of huge corporations. These corporations sought markets for their stock shares. The wildly speculative market meant investors needed information about stock activity. Dow took this opportunity to devise the Dow Jones Industrial Average (DJIA) in 1896. By tracking the closing stock prices of twelve companies, adding up their stock prices, and dividing by twelve, Dow came up with his average. The first such average appeared in the Wall Street Journal on May 26, 1896. Nowadays, the DJIA remains one of the oldest and popular stock indices in the world.

On October 25, 1896, Dow replaced the 2 non-rail stocks in the “20 Active Stock” index with 2 rail stocks and the index became the Dow Jones Railroad Average (DJRA). The DJRA remained a rail average of 20 stocks until January 2, 1970, when the average was changed to the Dow Jones Transportation Average (DJTA)—9 railroad stocks were replaced by 9 airline and trucking stocks.

Theory of stock price movements

In 1899, Dow started an editorial column in his newspaper in order to educate the general reader until his death in 1902. The column dealt mainly with stock market activities and economic matters. It was in this column that he often put forward his ideas of stock price movements, which were the foundation of what was later called the Dow Theory.
Unfortunately, his complete editorial writings are not available to the general reader. However, most of his writings can be found in the following books:
 Samuel Armstrong Nelson, [https://archive.org/details/abcofstockspecul00nelsiala?q=The+A+B+C+of+Stock+Speculation The A B C of Stock Speculation']', 1902
 George W. Bishop, Charles H. Dow and The Dow Theory'', 1960
 Laura Sether ed., Dow Theory Unplugged: Charles Dow's Original Editorials & Their Relevance Today, 2009
 		
The basic idea of Dow is that the stock price is affected by various factors interacting at the same time, leading to distinct patterns of stock price movement. The first step is to establish from past data the relationship between these patterns and each important factor. Thereafter, by identifying the main factors which are presently working, we can predict the probable future movement of stock price. One of the most important contributions to stock market thought was his theory of the three movements in the market.

Personal
At age 30, having moved to New York City the prior year to accept a job offer, Dow married his wife Lucy, who had a daughter from a previous marriage. The couple had no children of their own. It was in NYC that Dow reconnected with Jones having met him in Providence RI at the Providence Journal.

Death
In 1902, Dow began to have health problems and Bergstresser wanted to retire. The two sold their shares of the company to Clarence Barron, their Boston correspondent. Dow wrote his last editorial in April 1902. About eight months later, on December 4, 1902, he died at his home at 161 Lefferts Place, Brooklyn, New York, at the age of 51 after suffering a heart attack. Charles Dow is interred in North Burial Ground in Providence, Rhode Island.

See also
Dow Jones Indexes
William Peter Hamilton

References

External links
 
Dow Jones History
Dow Jones Indexes home page
Dow Jones Averages historical, research and trivia page
American National Biography
The Motley Fool

	

1851 births
1902 deaths
People from Sterling, Connecticut
Massachusetts Republicans
American male journalists
Dow Jones & Company
19th-century American businesspeople
Burials at North Burying Ground (Providence)
The Providence Journal people
People from Clinton Hill, Brooklyn